Mona Lill Fagerås (born 9 January 1972) is a Norwegian politician. 
She was elected representative to the Storting for the period 2017–2021 for the Socialist Left Party.

References

1972 births
Living people
Socialist Left Party (Norway) politicians
Women members of the Storting
Nordland politicians